is a district located in Mie Prefecture, Japan.

As of 2005, the district has an estimated population of 26,312 and a population density of 1,161.2 people per km2. The total area is 22.66 km2.

Towns and villages
Tōin

Mergers
December 1, 2003 - The towns of Inabe, Hokusei, Daian, and Fujiwara merged to form the new city of Inabe.(1 town)

Districts in Mie Prefecture